Elachista puplesisi is a moth of the family Elachistidae that is endemic to Turkmenistan.

The forewings are white, with a very weak yellowish tinge. The hindwings are whitish, weakly mottled by brownish scales.

Etymology
This species is named in honour of Prof. Rimantas Puplesis who has studied Microlepidoptera
of Central Asia.

References

puplesisi
Moths described in 2000
Moths of Asia
Endemic fauna of Turkmenistan